Benjamin Davies or Ben Davies may refer to:

Performers
 Ben Davies (tenor) (1858–1943), Welsh operatic tenor
 Benjamin Davies (actor) (born 1980), Scottish actor and producer

Sportsmen

Footballers
 Ben Davies (1880s footballer), English footballer, Port Vale inside right 1882–1887
 Ben Davies (footballer, born 1888) (1888–1970), English footballer
 Ben Davies (1930s footballer), English footballer, Port Vale goalkeeper 1929–1933
 Ben Davies (footballer, born 1981), English footballer
 Ben Davies (Australian footballer) (born 1986), Australian rules footballer
 Ben Davies (footballer, born 1993), Wales international footballer
 Ben Davies (footballer, born 1995), English footballer

Rugby 
 Ben Davies (rugby union) (1873–1930), Wales international rugby player
 Ben Davies (rugby league, born 1989), Welsh rugby league footballer
Ben Davies (rugby league, born 2000), English rugby league footballer

Others
 Ben Davies (darts player) (born 1980), English darts player
 Ben Davies (ice hockey) (born 1991), Welsh ice hockey player
 Ben Davies, pool player, 2005 EUKPF World Champion, 2018 IPA World Champion

Writers
 Ben Davies (Independent minister and author) (1840–1930), Welsh Independent minister and author
 Ben Davies (poet) (1864–1937), Welsh poet and Independent minister

Others
 Benjamin Davies (Hebraist) (1814–1875), Welsh Hebraist
 Benjamin Davies (politician) (1813–1904), Canadian politician
 Ben Davies (Hollyoaks), a character in Hollyoaks

See also
 Ben Davis (disambiguation)
 Ben-Ryan Davies (born 1988), English actor